Vasiliy Sergeevich Stepanov (born January 14, 1986) is a Russian actor who debuted in Bondarchuk's film The Inhabited Island as Maxim Kammerer (voiced by Maksim Matveyev).

Biography
Vasiliy Stepanov was born in Moscow in the Russian family of militsioner and saleswoman. His school holidays he mostly spent in the country, at his grandmother's. He graduated from College of Physical Education and Sports, with teaching credentials. He is a candidate for master of hand to hand combat, despite being a smoker with experience.

On April 10, 2017, Stepanov, being in a state of depression, threw himself out of the window of the 5th floor of an apartment building on Davydkovskaya Street in Moscow. He sustained multiple serious injuries and fractures.

Filmography

Cinema
 2008: Dark Planet (film) Part 1 or as literal Russian title: the Inhabited Island Part 1, directed by Fyodor Bondarchuk as Maxim Kammerer
 2009: Dark Planet (film) Part 2 or as literal Russian title: the Inhabited Island Part 2, directed by Fyodor Bondarchuk as Maxim Kammerer
 2012: My Guy - Angel
 2013: Okolofutbol as speaker
 2018: Tankers
 2018: Who's next, Dreamers? as Mark

Television
 2011: Insurance Case (TV Movie) as Artyom
 2011: Kiss of Socrates (Belarusian TV Series) as Kostya
 2012: Long Тime Рassed (Host in TV Show)

References

External links
 

1986 births
Living people
Russian male film actors
Male actors from Moscow